The 28th Sports Emmy Awards honoring American sports coverage in 2006 were presented on April 30, 2007 at Frederick P. Rose Hall in the Jazz at Lincoln Center, New York City. The nominees were announced on March 22.

Nominations
Winners are in bold

Outstanding Live Sports Special
131st Preakness Stakes - NBC
2006 FIFA World Cup - ABC
2006 Major League Baseball postseason - Fox Sports
NFL Wild Card Playoff: Pittsburgh vs. Indianapolis - CBS
2006 Masters Tournament  - CBS

Outstanding Live Sports SeriesESPN College FootballESPN Major League BaseballMonday Night FootballHBO BoxingNASCAR on TNT/NASCAR on NBCOutstanding Studio Show - WeeklyCollege GamedayInside the NFLNBA NationSunday NFL CountdownThe NFL TodayOutstanding Studio Show - DailyBaseball TonightInside the NBAOlympic IceOutside the LinesPardon the Interruption''

Outstanding Sports Personality, Studio Host
Bob Costas
Ernie Johnson, Jr.
James Brown
Jim Lampley
Joe Buck
Rich Eisen

Outstanding Sports Personality, Play-by-Play
Al Michaels
Jim Nantz
Joe Buck
Marv Albert
Mike Tirico

Outstanding Sports Personality, Studio Analyst
Charles Barkley
Cris Collinsworth
Jay Bilas
Jeff Hammond
Kirk Herbstreit

Outstanding Sports Personality, Sports Event Analyst
Cris Collinsworth
Darrell Waltrip
Jerry Bailey
Johnny Miller
Tim McCarver

Outstanding Camera Work
Jeep World of Adventure Sports - NBC Camerapersons: Brett Lowell, Josh Lowell
Cinderella Man: The James J. Braddock Story - ESPN2 Red Line Films
ESPN Sunday Night Football - ESPN Teases
Timeless - ESPN 2 Red Line Films
X Games Eleven - ABC Surfing - ESPN Productions

Outstanding Live Event Audio/Sound
ESPN Sunday Night Baseball - ESPN
Great Outdoor Games - ESPN
HBO World Championship Boxing - HBO
NASCAR on FOX - FOX

Outstanding Sports Journalism
Real Sports with Bryant Gumbel - HBO
Real Sports with Bryant Gumbel - HBO
SportsCenter - ESPN

Outstanding Open/Tease
Little League World Series - ABC
NFL on FOX: Super Bowl XXXIX - FOX
Winter Gravity Games - OLN
World Figure Skating Championships - ESPN

Outstanding Sports Documentary
Dare to Dream: The Story of the U.S. Women’s Soccer Team - HBO
Mantle - HBO
Perfect Upset - HBO
Rhythm in the Rope - ESPN2
You Write Better Than You Play: The Frank Deford Story - ESPN Classic

Sports Lifetime Achievement Award
Don Ohlmeyer

References

 028
Sports Emmy Awards